The list of ship launches in 1847 includes a chronological list of some ships launched in 1847.

 

1847
Ship launches